Matt Doorey (born 27 June 2000) is a professional rugby league footballer who plays as a  forward for the Parramatta Eels in the NRL. He previously played for the Canterbury-Bankstown Bulldogs.

Career

2020
Doorey made his first grade debut in round 14 of the 2020 NRL season for Canterbury-Bankstown against the Wests Tigers, scoring a try on debut in a 29–28 loss at Bankwest Stadium.

2021
Doorey made a total of 13 appearances for Canterbury in the 2021 NRL season as the club finished last and claimed the wooden spoon.

2022
Doorey made no appearances for Canterbury in the 2022 NRL season. On 25 September, Doorey played for Canterbury's NSW Cup team in their grand final loss to Penrith.
On 11 November, Doorey signed a two-year deal to join Canterbury's arch-rivals Parramatta starting in 2023.

2023
Doorey made his club debut for Parramatta in round 1 of the 2023 NRL season against Melbourne. Parramatta would lose 16-12 in golden point extra-time.
In round 3 against Manly, Doorey scored his first try for the club in Parramatta's 34-30 loss at Brookvale Oval.

References

External links
Canterbury-Bankstown Bulldogs profile

2000 births
Living people
Australian rugby league players
Canterbury-Bankstown Bulldogs players
Parramatta Eels players
Rugby league players from Sydney
Rugby league second-rows